Ramanna Shamanna is a 1988 Indian Kannada-language action drama film, written by Shanmugha Priyan and directed by B. Subba Rao. The film had an ensemble cast including Ambareesh, V. Ravichandran, Madhavi, Geetha and Devaraj, while many other prominent actors featured in supporting roles. The soundtrack and score composition was by popular singer S. P. Balasubrahmanyam and the lyrics along with the dialogues were written by Chi. Udaya Shankar. The film was a remake of Tamil film Chinna Thambi Periya Thambi.

Cast 
 Ambareesh as Rama
 V. Ravichandran as Shyam
 Madhavi
 Geetha 
 Devaraj
 Leelavathi
 Umashri
 Thoogudeepa Srinivas
 Ramesh Bhat
 Sundar Krishna Urs
 N. S. Rao
 Sudheer
 Mysore Lokesh
 Honnavalli Krishna

Soundtrack 
The music was composed by S. P. Balasubrahmanyam, with lyrics by Chi. Udaya Shankar.

References

External links 

 Full movie

1988 films
1980s Kannada-language films
Indian comedy films
Films scored by S. P. Balasubrahmanyam
Kannada remakes of Tamil films
1988 comedy films